This a list of the Spanish PROMUSICAE Top 20 physical Singles number-ones of 2004.

See also 
2004 in music
List of number-one hits in Spain

References

2004 in Spanish music
Spain singles
2004